Modi Stadium may refer to:

 Narendra Modi Stadium, formerly known as Motera Stadium, cricket stadium in Gujarat, India named after Indian prime minister Narendra Modi
 Green Park Stadium, formerly known as Modi Stadium, cricket stadium in Uttar Pradesh